Kisses in the Rain is John Pizzarelli's Telarc Records debut from 2000. The date includes his working trio, composed of Martin Pizzarelli on double-bass and Ray Kennedy on piano.

Track listing 
"From Monday On" 
"When I Take My Sugar to Tea" 
"I'm In the Mood for Love" 
"I Can't Get Up the Nerve"
"I Got Rhythm" 
"When Lights Are Low"
"I Thought About You"
"Should I?" 
"Don't Be That Way"
"I Could Have Told You So" 
"Kisses in the Rain" 
"Oscar Night" 
"Polka Dots and Moonbeams"
"Baby Just Come Home to Me" 
"Lifetime or Two, A"
"I Wouldn't Trade You"

Personnel
John Pizzarelliguitar, vocals
Martin Pizzarelli double-bass
Ray Kennedy piano

References

2000 albums
John Pizzarelli albums